Železná Ruda is a town in Klatovy District in the Plzeň Region of the Czech Republic. It has about 1,600 inhabitants. It is one of the important sports and tourist centres of the Bohemian Forest.

Administrative parts
Villages of Alžbětín, Debrník, Hojsova Stráž, Pancíř and Špičák are administrative parts of Železná Ruda.

Etymology
The town's name literally means "iron ore". It refers to rich deposits of iron ore that were found and mined here. The German name of the town comes from the Middle Ages, when it was a market town.

Geography

It lies in a wild mountainous terrain of the Bohemian Forest. The town is surrounded with thick coniferous woods. The southeastern part of the territory lies in the Šumava National Park, rest of the territory belongs to the Šumava Protected Landscape Area.

The Regen River springs on the southern slopes of Pancíř mountain and flows through the town proper to the German border. The Úhlava River springs on the western slopes of the same mountain and flows across the northern half of the municipal territory. 

Černé jezero, the largest natural lake in the country and Čertovo jezero, the third largest lake, are located in the territory of Železný Brod.

Climate
The climate is cool and wet humid continental hemiboreal (Dfb) with moderately cold, long winters and cool summers.

History
Železná Ruda was founded at the beginning of the 16th century as a mining town. After around 150 years, the iron ore stocks were extracted and iron production ended. Because quartz and limestone deposits were also located here, the town's industry reoriented to the glass industry. The first factory was built in 1624. The Alžbětín Glassworks was later one of the largest glassworks in the Bohemian Forest. In the second half of the 19th century, it was known mainly for plate glass. 

Between 1847 and 1877, the railway was built. 

Its German population was expelled after 1945.

Demographics

Economy
The local economy is very dependent on tourism because Železná Ruda is one of the most popular skiing centres of the Bohemian Forest, as well as a starting point for many hiking trips on both sides of the border. The town has also gained a reputation as a hotspot for prostitution shortly after the Velvet Revolution.

Transport

The town is located on a train line leading from Plzeň and Klatovy to the border station at Železná Ruda-Alžbětín/Bayerisch Eisenstein. This station building is divided by the national border between the Czech Republic and Germany.

Sights

A railway tunnel goes under Špičák.

The most valuable historical monument is the Church of Our Lady of Perpetual Help of the Star. It was built in the Baroque style in 1729–1732. Its peculiarity is the floor plan of the six-pointed star and two cupolas with a star. Other historical sights include the Chapel of Saints Anthony of Padua and Barbara, and the Stations of the Cross.

The local museum and information centre are located in a house from 1877, which was once the home of a well-known family of glassmakers. There is an exhibition of traditional glass, documents and photographs concerning history available all year round.

Twin towns – sister cities

Železná Ruda is twinned with:
 Aldeno, Italy
 Bayerisch Eisenstein, Germany
 Zernez, Switzerland

References

External links

Cities and towns in the Czech Republic
Ski areas and resorts in the Czech Republic
Populated places in Klatovy District
Czech Republic–Germany border crossings
Bohemian Forest